Lyubov Yuryevna Arkus (born 1960) is a Russian director, film expert, editor, founder of Seans magazine, Anton's Right Here charity foundation, and Chapaev.media educational project.

Biography

Early years and education 
As recalled by Arkus, her family was of Jewish descent, her father's ancestors stemmed from Odesa and lived in Harbin. Her paternal grandfather Boris Arkus (1896–1938) was arrested in repressions of 1937 and shot in 1938, his widow was arrested and spent all her life in labour camps.

Arkus entered Gerasimov Institute of Cinematography from the third attempt, she studied at the course of Lidiya Zaitseva. After graduation in 1984, she worked as a literary secretary of Viktor Shklovsky and an editor at Lenfilm.

Seans 

In 1989, she founded Seans magazine that soon became the best Russian blueprint on cinema. In 1993, Arkus became the editor-in-chief. In 1993, Seans launched its publishing house. In 2001-2004 it released a monumental seven-volume almanac Recent History of Russian Cinematography. 1986-2000. Arkus wrote multiple articles, compiled and edited the book. In 2010, Seans established its creative workshop. Under Arkus, the publication grew into the most influential magazine on cinema with leading
modern writers as columnists. By peers, the magazine is acknowledged ‘the last stronghold of common sense in modern Russia’.

Anton's Right Here 

In 2008, while working on Seans''' initiative Cinema of open action, Arkus encountered Anton Kharitonov, a teenager with ASD. She became deeply involved in his life, trying to save him from a psychoneurological dispensary. To gain public attention to problems of people with ASD, Arkus decided to film a documentary about Anton.

Mostly the film budget was spent on solving the heroes' problems. Operator Alisher Xamidxojaev denied payment for his work and financially supported Anton. AdVita foundation paid for Renata, Anton's mother, cancer treatment. Konstantin Ernst helped to release Anton from the neuropsychiatric detention center. Friends of Arkus Sergei Bodrov, Renata Litvinova, Dunya Smirnova, Anna Parmas, and many more helped Anton in crisis moments.

The movie Anton's Right Here'' received numerous Russian and international awards and was screened at the 69th Venice Film Festival.

In 2013, Arkus opened a charitable foundation, named in honour of Anton Kharitonov. The foundation helps socialization, education and creative involvement of children and adults with ASD. First of its kind in Russia, by 2021 the foundation grew into a center that helps more than 500 families with ASD members.

Other activities
In March 2022, Arkus signed a collective appeal of film critics, film historians and film journalists of Russia against Russian invasion of Ukraine.

References 

Gerasimov Institute of Cinematography alumni
Russian film critics
Russian film directors
1960 births
Living people

Russian women journalists
Russian women editors
Russian documentary filmmakers
Russian women film directors
Russian disability rights activists
People from Lviv
Film theorists
Russian women critics
Russian activists against the 2022 Russian invasion of Ukraine